Peter Robert Worthington (born 22 April 1947) is an English former professional footballer who played as a left back, making nearly 300 appearances in the Football League.

Personal life
Born in Halifax, Worthington had two brothers who were also professional footballers - Dave and Frank. His nephew Gary was also a professional footballer.

Career
Worthington played in the Football League for Halifax Town, Middlesbrough, Notts County, Southend United and Hartlepool United.

References

1947 births
Living people
English footballers
Halifax Town A.F.C. players
Middlesbrough F.C. players
Notts County F.C. players
Southend United F.C. players
Hartlepool United F.C. players
English Football League players
Association football fullbacks
Footballers from Halifax, West Yorkshire